Georgiana is a given name.

Georgiana may also refer to:

Places
Georgiana, Alabama
Georgiana, Florida
Georgiana County, New South Wales
Electoral district of King and Georgiana

Plants and animals
Georgiana (beetle), a genus of beetles
Occirhenea georgiana, a species of snail
Quercus georgiana, a species of Oak
Wuestneiopsis georgiana, a plant pathogen

Schools
Georgiana Molloy Anglican School, a private school located in The Busselton suburb of Yalyalup, Western Australia
Georgiana Bruce Kirby Preparatory School, a non-profit independent school located in Harvey West, Santa Cruz, California, in the United States

Ships
Georgiana (ship), several ships
SS Georgiana, a ship wrecked during the American Civil War
, a United States Navy patrol boat in commission from 1917 to 1918